Angels of Sex is a Spanish film by Xavier Villaverde starring Álvaro Cervantes, Àstrid Bergès-Frisbey, and Llorenç González. It was released in 2012 (the UK release title is The Sex of Angels).

Plot
Bruno, a struggling student, loves his girlfriend Carla but discovers a new side to himself when he meets a street dancer named Rai. A new generation navigates bisexuality, torn affections, and open relationships in a steamy love triangle. The movie depicts a polyamorous bisexual relationship and love triangle between Bruno, Rai and Carla.

Cast
Álvaro Cervantes as Rai
Àstrid Bergès-Frisbey as Carla
Llorenç González as Bruno
Lluïsa Castell as Carla's mother
Marc García-Coté as Adrián
Ricard Farré as Oscar
Sonia Méndez as Marta
Julieta Marocco as María
Marc Pociello as Dani

Reception
The film has been cited as an example of sexual fluidity in recent queer European cinema.

Location
The film was shot at and is set in various locations around Barcelona.

See also 
 Discussing the sex of angels, the scholastic question from which the title is derived

References

External links

2012 films
Male bisexuality in film
Spanish LGBT-related films
2010s Spanish-language films
2010s Catalan-language films
Spanish romantic comedy films
Films shot in Barcelona
Polyamory in fiction
2012 romantic comedy films
LGBT-related romantic comedy films
Bisexuality-related films
2010s Spanish films